Bryan Cameron (born 25 February 1989 in Brampton, Ontario) is a Canadian former professional ice hockey player who is currently playing for men's senior hockey for the Hamilton Steelhawks of the Allan Cup Hockey.

Playing career
Cameron was selected by the Los Angeles Kings in the third round of the 2007 NHL Entry Draft with the 82nd overall pick. On 30 April 2009, he was signed as a free agent by the Calgary Flames to a three-year entry level contract. Throughout the tenure of his contract with the Flames, Cameron featured predominantly with their second tier affiliate in the ECHL, the Utah Grizzlies.

His rights were released by the Flames at the conclusion of his contract on 2 July 2013.

After a season abroad with Ciarko PBS Bank STS Sanok in the Polska Hokej Liga, the top-level league in Poland, Cameron returned as a free agent and agreed to a one-year deal in a return to the ECHL with the Atlanta Gladiators on 22 September 2016. In the 2016–17 season, Cameron register 10 points in 17 games with the Gladiators, before he opted to return abroad in agreeing to a move to the United Kingdom to sign for the Fife Flyers of the EIHL on 2 January 2017.

Career statistics

Awards and honours

References

External links

1989 births
Abbotsford Heat players
Alaska Aces (ECHL) players
Arizona Sundogs players
Atlanta Gladiators players
Barrie Colts players
Belleville Bulls players
Brampton Beast players
Canadian ice hockey right wingers
Fife Flyers players
Ice hockey people from Ontario
Living people
Los Angeles Kings draft picks
Ontario Junior Hockey League players
Saale Bulls Halle players
San Francisco Bulls players
Sportspeople from Brampton
KH Sanok players
Utah Grizzlies (ECHL) players
Victoria Salmon Kings players
Canadian expatriate ice hockey players in Poland
Canadian expatriate ice hockey players in Germany
Canadian expatriate ice hockey players in Scotland
21st-century Canadian people
Canadian expatriate ice hockey players in the United States